Julie Wilhelmine Hagen-Schwarz ( – ) was a Baltic German painter, primarily of portraits.

Biography 
She was the daughter of the painter August Matthias Hagen; born while her parents were on a painting excursion. She displayed an early interest in drawing, so her father wasted no time in giving her lessons.  After graduating from the public schools, she enrolled at the University of Dorpat (now University of Tartu), where she was soon attracted to portrait painting.

After graduating, she received a grant to study in Germany. She began with Friedrich Gonne in Dresden, then went to Munich, obtaining a position in the workshops of Moritz Rugendas. Three years later, she returned to Tartu and received another grant from Tsar Nicholas I to study in Italy. This time, she was accompanied by her father, who hoped that the Italian climate would help his failing eyesight.

In 1854 she returned home, already a well-known artist due to her participation in several exhibits throughout Europe. Soon after, she married the astronomer Ludwig Schwarz, who later became Director of the local observatory. Her honeymoon consisted of an expedition to Southeast Siberia, covering 600 versts, where her husband was part of a team exploring mineral resources and preparing a detailed map on behalf of the Russian Geographical Society. As might be expected, she took the opportunity to sketch everything of interest.

In 1858, she became the first woman elected to the Imperial Academy of Arts. After that, she spent much of her time in Saint Petersburg, participating in all the local and national exhibitions. Overall, she produced more than 700 portraits.

Selected paintings

See also
 List of German women artists

References

Further reading
 Epp Preem and Mart Sander, Julie Hagen-Schwarz 1824—1902, LiteRarity, Tallinn 2009

External links

 Works of Julie Wilhelmine Hagen-Schwarz in the Estonian Art Museums Digital Archive
 "From Livonia with Love", part 2, Julie Hagen-Schwarz @ LiveInternet blog. More paintings with biographies of her teachers and family members.

1824 births
1902 deaths
People from Valmiera Municipality
People from Kreis Wolmar
Baltic-German people
19th-century German painters
19th-century Estonian painters
German women painters
Estonian women painters
19th-century women artists